The United States Judo Association is a sports association in the United States. It was formed in 1969 following a reorganization of the Armed Forces Judo Association, and is one of three national judo associations in the United States, the other two being USA Judo and the United States Judo Federation.

History
The US Judo Association was founded by George Harris, George Bass, Robey Reed, Jim Bregman, Philip S. Porter, Rick Mertins, and Karl Geis.

Presidents and Executive Directors
Philip S. Porter

Edward Szrejter

George Bass, George Harris, Jim Nichols, Jim Bregman, Jesse Jones, Mike Szrejter, Jim Webb, AnnMaria De Mars, Gary Goltz, Marc Cohen, John Paccione, Bob Rush, Celita Schutz, and Andrew Connelly

References

Sports organizations of the United States
Judo organizations
Judo in the United States